Valparaíso is a town and municipality in Caquetá Department, Colombia.

Climate
Valparaíso has a tropical rainforest climate (Köppen Af) with heavy to very heavy rainfall year-round.

References

Municipalities of Caquetá Department